Levodopa-induced dyskinesia (LID) is a form of dyskinesia associated with levodopa (l-DOPA), used to treat Parkinson's disease. It often involves hyperkinetic movements, including chorea, dystonia, and athetosis.

In the context of Parkinson's disease (PD), dyskinesia is often the result of long-term dopamine therapy. These motor fluctuations occur in up to 80% of PD patients after 5–10 years of l-DOPA treatment, with the percentage of affected patients increasing over time. Based on the relationship with levodopa dosing, dyskinesia most commonly occurs at the time of peak l-DOPA plasma concentrations and is thus referred to as peak-dose dyskinesia (PDD). As patients advance, they may present with symptoms of diphasic dyskinesia (DD), which occurs when the drug concentration rises or falls. If dyskinesia becomes too severe or impairs the patient's quality of life, a reduction in l-Dopa might be necessary, however this may be accompanied by a worsening of motor performance. Therefore, once established, LID is difficult to treat. Amongst pharmacological treatments, N-methyl-D-aspartate (NMDA) antagonist, (a glutamate receptor), amantadine, has been proven to be clinically effective in a small number of placebo controlled randomized controlled trials, while many others have only shown promise in animal models. Attempts to moderate dyskinesia by the use of other treatments such as bromocriptine (Parlodel), a dopamine agonist, appears to be ineffective. In order to avoid dyskinesia, patients with the young-onset form of the disease or young-onset Parkinson's disease (YOPD) are often hesitant to commence l-DOPA therapy until absolutely necessary for fear of suffering severe dyskinesia later on. Alternatives include the use of DA agonists (i.e. ropinirole or pramipexole) in lieu of early l-DOPA treatment which delays the use of l-DOPA. Additionally, a review  shows that highly soluble l-DOPA prodrugs may be effective in avoiding the in vivo blood concentration swings that potentially lead to motor fluctuations and dyskinesia.

Mechanism

Levodopa-induced dyskinesia has long been thought to arise through pathological alterations in pre-synaptic and post-synaptic signal transduction in the nigrostriatal pathway (dorsal striatum). It is thought that the stage of illness, dosage of l-DOPA, frequency of l-DOPA treatment and the youth of the patient at the onset of symptoms contribute to the severity of the involuntary movements associated with LID.

In experiments employing real-time electrophysiological recordings in awake and active animals, LIDs have been shown to be strongly associated with cortical gamma-oscillations with accompanying Δc-fos overexpression, proposedly due to a dysregulation of dopamine signaling in the cortico-basal ganglia circuitry. This was concluded partially from reduced tyrosine hydroxylase (TH) staining in the cortex - and the fact that a dopamine receptor 1 antagonist, delivered exclusively to the cortex, relieved the dyskinesia at its peak-time.

ΔFosB overexpression in the dorsal striatum (nigrostriatal dopamine pathway) via viral vectors generates levodopa-induced dyskinesia in animal models of Parkinson's disease. Dorsal striatal ΔFosB is overexpressed in rodents and primates with dyskinesias; moreover, postmortem studies of individuals with Parkinson's disease that were treated with levodopa have also observed similar dorsal striatal ΔFosB overexpression.

Treatment

Levetiracetam, an antiepileptic drug which has been demonstrated to reduce the severity of levodopa-induced dyskinesias, has been shown to dose-dependently decrease the induction of dorsal striatal ΔFosB expression in rats when co-administered with levodopa. Although the signal transduction mechanism involved in this effect is unknown.

Nicotine (administered by dermal adhesive patches) has also been shown to improve Levodopa-induced dyskinesia and other PD symptoms.

Patients with prominent dyskinesia resulting from high doses of antiparkinsonian medications may benefit from deep brain stimulation (DBS), which may benefit the patient in two ways: 1) DBS theoretically allows a reduction in l-DOPA dosage of 50–60% (tackling the underlying cause); 2) DBS treatment itself (in the subthalamic nucleus or globus pallidus) has been shown to reduce dyskinesia.

In 2017, the FDA approved the first treatment for levodopa-induced dyskinesia for Parkinson's patients: Gocovri, amantadine manufactured by Adamas Pharmaceuticals. Mavoglurant and ketamine are also currently studied for the treatment of this disease.

References

External links 

Parkinson's disease